Castledermot Abbey is a ruined Franciscan friary in Castledermot, County Kildare, Ireland. It was founded at some point before 1247. A previous monastery had been founded on the same site by Diarmait, a son of Áed Róin, King of Ulster, in the ninth century AD.

History 
The abbey sits on the site of a previous monastery founded by Diarmait, a son of Áed Róin, King of Ulster, in the ninth century AD. The friary was founded by Walter de Riddlesford the Younger at some point prior to 1247.

References

Notes

Sources 

Franciscan monasteries in the Republic of Ireland
Archaeological sites in County Kildare
National Monuments in County Kildare